The following is a list of characters from the series G.I. Joe: Renegades.

Renegades

Duke
Duke (voiced by Jason Marsden) – The team's de facto leader, Sergeant Conrad Hauser is an honorable and straightforward military man. He tends to be stubborn, stoic and puts the safety of his teammates, and his family first, even if they protest. He was once a rising football star in high school, but an injury in his senior year ruined his chances at getting a college scholarship.

Flint, who was indirectly responsible for his injury, later helped him out by suggesting he join the Army. On the show, his typical attire is a combat uniform, with a beige vest over a gray and olive short-sleeved shirt with shoulder pads, with olive drab cargo pants. In combat he favors a plasma pulse pistol. After the events in "Revelations, Part 2", he now has the famous scar on his face.

Snake Eyes
Snake Eyes (voiced by Danny Cooksey) – A longtime friend of Scarlett's, Snake Eyes is a ninja. He was given the name "Hebi no me" ("Snake Eyes") by his sensei Hard Master because he possesses the "steely gaze of a serpent". His real name and his exact connection with the military have not yet been revealed, but he appears to at least have some official connection with Scarlett's operations in Military Intelligence.

Snake Eyes cannot speak; due to a throat injury he suffered from an altercation with Storm Shadow following Hard Master's death, though Scarlett is often able to understand what he wants to convey due to their long time training together. His clothing is a gray and black body suit with a slitted visor, matching trousers, and he carries a pair of tsuba-less ninjatō on his back.

Among the Joes, Snake Eyes is the only one that is not technically "wanted" as there was no record of his presence at the plant explosion. In "Revelations, Part 1", it was revealed that he suffers disfiguring burns following an explosion in a Cobra Research station caused by Dr. O'Hara's MASS device.

Scarlett
Scarlett (voiced by Natalia Cigliuti) – Because of her hair color, the Joes call her "Red" for short. Lieutenant Shana "Scarlett" O'Hara is Military Intelligence officer who has been obsessed with exposing Cobra as a sinister organization. She is a whiz with computers and was also trained in Ninjitsu by Snake Eyes, whom she continues to have a deep emotional connection to. She feels responsible for the Joes' status as fugitives, because she more or less ordered them to go with her on an unauthorized operation, without their knowledge. Her uniform consists of an orange vest worn over a tight gray long-sleeved shirt, lighter gray pants, and a locket with a picture of her and her father inside of it. She uses a pistol or a Plasma Pulse Crossbow in combat.

Roadblock
Roadblock (voiced by Kevin Michael Richardson) – The team's mechanic, heavy weapons specialist and cook. Corporal Marvin Hinton is an imposing figure, but is gentle giant and a cheerful loudmouth who enjoys listening to heavy metal and singing loudly (much to Tunnel Rat's annoyance). He wears a heavy olive drab ballistic vest over a light yellow shirt, and brown trousers. In combat he carries a large plasma pulse machine gun.

Tunnel Rat
Tunnel Rat (voiced by Matthew Yang King) – The team's medic and EOD specialist. Private First Class Nicky Lee grew up in Brooklyn where he spent much of his youth exploring the subway tunnels and sewers. He is very knowledgeable of soil types, insects, fungi, medicinal plants and most things found underground. Interpersonally, he tends to be sarcastic and likes to crack wise, often acting as comic relief. He wears a green shirt with a brown bandana and watch cap, and a pair of baggy overalls with the shoulder-straps undone so the upper portion hangs down from his waist. Tunnel Rat is Chinese-American and at one point mentioned his parents run a kosher Chinese restaurant in Brooklyn, alluding to the fact that he doesn't celebrate Christmas.

Rip Cord
Ripcord (voiced by Khary Payton) – A paratrooper brought with the team during their initial mission to the Cobra facility. Private Wallace Weems is a smart mouthed daredevil and is responsible for many of the team's nicknames. He was supposedly killed in an explosion in "The Descent" Pt. 1 when a Bio-Viper grabbed him. In "Prodigal", Ripcord is found alive in a Cobra-run medical facility under the alias Patient X.

Due to the fact that Ripcord lost his memory in the explosion, interaction with the Joes helps to bring it back. He and the Joes soon learn he had been experimented on by Doctor Mindbender and Cobra Commander causing him to become a hybrid of both. With a proximity remote signal, the Cobra Drones broadcasting the signal can transform him into a Bio-Viper. After transforming inside one of Flint's helicopters, Duke helps Ripcord calm down even with a robot transmitting the activation signal.

Ripcord then rejoins the Joes, but Cobra Commander vows to reclaim Ripcord alive and intact. Ripcord would later gain full control over his powers as a Bio-Viper in the episode "The Anomaly" thanks to a Sewage-Viper that removed the chip from his head. He also gains a mouth and the ability to speak in his Bio-Viper form.

Breaker
Breaker (voiced by Greg Ellis) – Alvin Kibbey is a college student who used to work for SSS Mart (which is owned by Cobra Industries) until he was fired upon being accused of stealing one of their scanners (which he secretly did after that) Alvin ends up starting an Anti-Cobra blog under the alias of the "Coyote". G.I. Joe ends up stumbling upon a plot to dispose of him when they managed to discover that a package to him had a detonator.

When they find Alvin, he recognizes Scarlett by her blog screen name. Alvin explains that the scanner he stole contains the info on any illegal weapon selling that SSS Mart has been doing. G.I. Joe ends up protecting him when Baroness sends Major Bludd to assassinate him. Even though Major Bludd threw his knife at Alvin's backpack, it ended up destroying the scanner. When G.I. Joe fled, Alvin managed to rewire the detonator that was meant for him which blew up the warehouse costing Major Bludd his left eye.

Seeing as Cobra thinks he's dead, Alvin joins up with G.I. Joe under the codename "Breaker" while Roadblock names their transport the "Coyote". In the episode "Return of the Arashikage, Part 1", it appears that Breaker has been placed in a hidden location by G.I. Joe to find any other evidence that would expose the illegal activities of Cobra Industries. In "The Enemy of My Enemy", Breaker is mentioned to have some informants working for him to supply any info to G.I. Joe, if those informants aren't killed by one of Cobra Commander's operatives first. At the end of "Revelations, Part 1", it was revealed that he joined the Falcons as their newest member when proof of Cobra Industries' illegal activities were presented to General Abernathy.

Falcons
The Falcons are a group of military officers sent by General Abernathy to bring in the G.I. Joe team.

Flint
Flint (voiced by Johnny Messner) – The highly decorated leader of military task force "The Falcons" is in charge of catching the G.I. Joes. First Lieutenant Dashiell Faireborn has been locking horns with Duke since high school and that's one of the many reasons why he's tracking Duke now. Flint might seem cocky, but he's a decent guy, even if he doesn't believe Cobra is evil and is all about bringing in Duke's team. His history with Duke started when he was on an opposing team at a high school football match as seen in a flashback in "Homecoming" Pt. 1. He prevented Duke from scoring a touchdown and inadvertently broke his leg, costing Duke college scholarships. When he encountered Duke later, Flint got him enrolled in the army and thereafter took an interest in his career. It is revealed in a flashback that Flint put the (then) Corporal Hauser forward for a decoration for his role in saving the life of a soldier who had stepped on a mine.

Lady Jaye
Lady Jaye (voiced by Nika Futterman) – She's tough, scrappy, and "one of the guys." So when they call Sergeant Alison Hart-Burnett "Lady Jaye," it's almost a joke. She's supposed to be working to bring in the Joes, but Lady Jaye owes Duke after he saved her life when her helicopter crashed during a mission to stop a weapons trade held by M.A.R.S. Industries. Following the incident at Cobra Pharmaceuticals, Lady Jaye is recruited by Flint to accompany him on his mission to capture Duke's group. Lady Jaye secretly feeds his team intel to keep them out of Flint's reach and also helps them with their battle against Cobra Industries.

Wild Bill
Wild Bill (voiced by Charlie Schlatter) – William Hardy is a helicopter pilot and Warrant Officer who worked for the U.S. Army as a pilot. While escaping and disguised as the Baroness, Zartan stole a camo suit and a Cobra truck. With the Falcons in pursuit, Flint radioed for a helicopter. Lady Jaye, Baroness, and Cobra soldiers waited with Flint on the highway. Wild Bill's helicopter responded to Flint's message who ordered him to take them aboard to pursue the Joes and Zartan. Baroness insisted on going along, but Flint ordered her to leave her soldiers (from which he took their weapons). Wild Bill was able to fly Flint and Lady Jaye to where the Joes were found to be battling Zartan.

Lift-Ticket
Lift-Ticket (voiced by Charlie Schlatter) – Victor Sikorski is a helicopter pilot. He is first seen with Flint and the rest of the Falcons when they go to pick up Ripcord. When it came to the Ripcord/Bio-Viper fighting the Bio-Viper form during his fight with Duke, Lift-Ticket fired a missile as the Ripcord/Bio-Viper took the blunt of the explosion. He did get into trouble with Lady Jaye for firing a missile against her orders.

Heavy Duty
Heavy Duty (voiced by Keith Ferguson) – Corporal Hershel Dalton is the estranged cousin of Roadblock. Flint recruits Dalton to bring in Roadblock in exchange for membership into his Falcons team. It's revealed that Heavy Duty doesn't like Roadblock because of something that went wrong in the past. That's why Heavy Duty moved away from his hometown of Biloxi, Mississippi, to go to college and later live in Idaho. While on the hunt for his cousin, Heavy Duty manages to ambush Roadblock after their grandfather's remembrance (Captain Jefferson Hinton, who served as a pilot in the Tuskegee Airmen and considered an honored son of Biloxi). Then the two are ambushed by Major Bludd and Heavy Duty handcuffs himself to Roadblock. He drags Roadblock into his vehicle which leads them into a car chase until Major Bludd blows up the bridge.

Due to Major Bludd firing his laser onto the car as it was sinking, Heavy Duty loses the keys to his handcuffs. But manages to pull himself and Roadblock out of the river, however they end up in the swamp while evading alligators. Luckily, Roadblock was able to fight off the alligator by wrestling it much to the surprise of Heavy Duty. Major Bludd then attacks them in a swamp boat as Roadblock saves Heavy Duty from a large snake. After a brief fight, Roadblock and Heavy Duty try to break the handcuffs as Major Bludd arrives and captures them. While Major Bludd prepares a trap for the others, Roadblock and Heavy Duty work to get out of the handcuffs. At the same time, Heavy Duty realizes that his cousin was telling the truth when Bludd confirms that he's freelancing with Cobra.

The same alligator attacks them, but Snake Eyes rescues them and scares the alligator away. Roadblock and Heavy Duty then join the other Joes in fighting off Major Bludd and the Baroness who shows up unexpectedly. After the fight, Roadblock and Heavy Duty return to their grandma's house where she revealed that their grandpa had given his inheritance to both of them, making Heavy Duty animosity towards his cousin to end. After Ripcord thinking Heavy Duty's name meant did a lot of tours of duty, it was revealed that Hershel had been nicknamed by Grandma Hinton stating when he was a baby, he could fill a diaper so fast. When Heavy Duty wonders how he's going to explain all of this to Flint, Roadblock tells him that he'll think of something.

Cobra Industries

Cobra Commander
Cobra Commander (voiced by Charlie Adler) – Cobra Commander is reinterpreted as a corporate businessman known as Adam DeCobray, head of the legitimate Cobra pharmaceutical corporation which masks his ruthless terrorist organization that is determined to rule the world. Due to a deteriorative disease, his lower face is damaged with red/blue eye and a bald head.

This forces Cobra Commander's to don a plastic shielding wrap before donning his signature full-faced mask for life support. He keeps his disfigured appearance a secret from the world, only ever appearing to the public as a normal-looking virtual simulation over video screens except that only the Joes, Destro, Doctor Mindbender and Baroness who knew his true-self.

Cobra Commander is also responsible for planting a metal mask on Destro that only he can remove. Cobra Commander also has a genetically modified giant cobra named Serpentor as a pet. In the Season 1 finale, he ends up confronting the Joes himself and seemingly met a horrible end by falling into a vat of Bio-Viper material. He was later shown to survive the implosion at the mansion and became horribly deformed from the Bio-Viper material and declaring vengeance.

Destro
Destro (voiced by Clancy Brown) – An infamous arms dealer, James McCullen XXIV started M.A.R.S. Industries to compete with Cobra prior to a literal corporate takeover to supply Cobra with his tech skills and weapon designs. However, when his attempt to get rid of Doctor Mindbender through the Joes is revealed, McCullen is temporarily swallowed by Serpentor and forced to wear a metal mask that only Cobra Commander can remove receiving the name "Destro".

In "Castle Destro", Destro and Baroness work on the Bio-Dag device. When the Joes were captured and interrogated, Destro and Baroness learned about the Techno-Viper leading them to the location of Castle Destro causing both of them to think that Doctor Mindbender programmed it to get rid of Destro. In the Season 1 finale, he fought the Joes in a prototype H.I.S.S. tank until they threw missiles at it. It is unknown if Destro survived the H.I.S.S.'s destruction or the implosion at the mansion.

Baroness
Baroness (voiced by Tatyana Yassukovich) – Known as Anastasia Cisarovna, Baroness is also a femme fatale, an aristocrat, and a corporate saboteur who serves as Cobra Commander's right-hand woman. In charge of maintaining Cobra Industries' friendly publicity while overseeing its illegal activities, Baroness would not hesitate to dealing with any loose ends that would jeopardize Cobra Industries. Like other G.I. Joe series, Baroness is shown to have a good relationship with Destro.

In "Union of the Snake", it is revealed that Baroness's family has done things that made them enemies of the Oktober Guard. In the Season 1 finale, she along with Doctor Mindbender got sucked into the vortex of the M.A.S.S. device. It is currently unknown what had happened to them.

Doctor Mindbender
Doctor Mindbender (voiced by Charlie Schlatter) – The youthful and arrogant Dr. Brian Bender is a mad scientist who is one of the most wanted criminals due to his lack of morals in inhuman genetic experiments. He was brought into Cobra to provide his knowledge in its secret Bio-Viper program. He was also responsible for creating Serpentor the Cobra to be Cobra Commander's pet. He later obtained Tomax and Xamot to be used as part of his experiment that involved modifying the Bio Vipers.

After the loss of Ripcord, Cobra Commander has begun to be fed-up with Mindbender, and threatens to have Serpentor, his own creation, devour him. Mindbender is quick to remind the Commander that he alone knows about his disease and can help treat it.

Cobra Commander allows Mindbender to live for now, but is quick to punish him with an electrical blast from his cane as a way of reminding the doctor who was in charge. He later tried to recreate the M.A.S.S. device experiment for Cobra. Eventually, the device failed and sucked him and Baroness into the wormhole of the destroyed machine. It is currently unknown what had happened to them.

Major Bludd
Major Bludd (voiced by André Sogliuzzo) – Major Sebastian Bludd is a mercenary hired by the Baroness to eliminate ex-Cobra Industries employee turned Anti-Cobra internet blogger Alvin Kibbey when a mail bomb plot (meant for Kibbey) is foiled by the Renegades. In his first encounter with the Joes, Major Bludd locates his target, but Kibbey is saved by the Renegades. Major Bludd tracks them to a SSS mart warehouse (part of Cobra illegal weapons business) and manages to hit Kibbey with a knife seemingly killing him.

Fortunately, the knife hits Kibbey's backpack and not him, but it hit the stolen Cobra scanner it contained. Major Bludd is caught in the warehouse explosion caused by Kibbey's rewired mail bomb when he returned the bomb back to its sender. But he survives and reports to Baroness that he has eliminated his target.

As he holds his hand over his injured left eye, Major Bludd tells Baroness that he will do any job to take on the Renegades for free (as he blames them for his new injury) in "Cousins", when he was hunting the Joes, he accidentally got in a tussle with an alligator. When he emerges from the water, it is heavily implied by the Baroness' reaction that he lost his right arm.

Storm Shadow
Storm Shadow (voiced by Andrew Kishino) – Tomisaburo Arashikage is a ninja who once trained with Snake Eyes under his uncle, the Hard Master (the head of the Arashikage clan) but wanting to get rid of Snake Eyes, Tomisaburo slipped poison into his rival's tea. However, the Hard Master accidentally drank the tea and Tomisaburo projected the blame on Snake Eyes with intent to kill him while taking over the Arashikage clan. Upon learning that Snake Eyes is alive and with the G.I. Joe team that Snake Eyes is a part of making the news, Storm Shadow trails them to Snake Eyes' hidden dojo.

Managing to obtain Jinx and the Arashikage Clan's sword, Storm Shadow leaves his cousin to run their clan while he pursues the G.I. Joe team to finish the job. Eventually, his intent to kill Snake Eyes led to Storm Shadow forming an allegiance with Baroness and Cobra Industries. In "Cutting Edge", Baroness calls on Storm Shadow when a high-tech ninja is targeting Cobra Commander.

Storm Shadow ends up discovering that the high-tech ninja was actually Jinx who had been told what really happened to the Hard Master. After fighting a cadre of B.A.T.s, Storm Shadow admits his guilt before he disappears into the shadows and renouncing leadership of the Arashikage clan. According to Jinx; Storm Shadow is a "warrior without a master, he will never truly find peace".

Scrap-Iron
Scrap-Iron (voiced by Phil LaMarr) – Scrap-Iron is a scientist at M.A.R.S. Industries who captured people from the streets to brainwash them and test M.A.R.S. Industries new exo-armors and power their rage. He did this on behalf of Destro while posing as a preacher offering veteran's coffee. Tunnel Rat became one of the victims. Soon, Roadblock ended up captured when he found Scrap-Iron and subjected to the same experiment that Tunnel Rat and the other people befell. When G.I. Joe arrived and disabled the controls on the exo-armor, Roadblock lunged towards Destro and Scrap-Iron as they get into their helicopter. Though Roadblock managed to deflect the missile back at the helicopter injuring the right side of Scrap-Iron's head. Destro tells Scrap-Iron that his injuries will be avenged.

The Dreadnoks
The Dreadnoks are a biker gang that is allied with Cobra Industries.
Zartan (voiced by Brian Bloom) – The leader of the Dreadnoks who has the ability to mimic anyone's voice. He and his Dreadnoks terrorized a town in Kansas for their protection money even putting fear in the local Sheriff Terry. Zartan managed to capture a local waitress named Wendy causing Snake Eyes to go after her.

Snake Eyes managed to free Wendy and got ganged up on by Zartan and the other Dreadnoks. The other G.I. Joe members had to teach the town to stand up to Zartan and the Dreadnoks. When the Dreadnoks presented the captured Snake Eyes, Zartan ends up fighting the Joes when the Dreadnoks attack. When Zartan takes Wendy captive, he ends up tackled by Sheriff Terry who manages to defeat Zartan and arrest him. Zartan and the Dreadnoks then ended up being handed over to the Falcons.

During the time when Zartan was being used by Flint and Lady Jaye to track down G.I. Joe, an altercation between them, G.I. Joe, and Baroness' convoy caused Zartan to escape and steal the prototype experimental "chameleon mold" suit (which resembles Zartan's usual outfit used in the other cartoons) that enables him to mimic the appearance and mannerism of anyone he comes in contact with. After a fight with G.I. Joe followed by a power surge that left black marks around Zartan's eyes, Zartan was defeated and returned to jail while Baroness takes the chameleon mold to Cobra Commander.

Due to the device acquiring the DNA of the first wearer as part of the chameleon mold's "fail safe imprinting feature" and Baroness having mind-wiped the creator that worked with Cobra on it, Baroness ends up visiting Zartan in jail where she makes a "get out of jail" offer that Zartan accepts. This includes Buzzer (voiced by Charlie Adler) – a chainsaw-wielding member of the Dreadnoks, Monkeywrench (voiced by Charlie Adler) – A member of the Dreadnoks who is an explosives expert, Ripper (voiced by Jason Marsden) – Member of the Dreadnoks, Road Pig (voiced by Kevin Michael Richardson) – A member of the Dreadnoks who wields a sledgehammer made from a cinderblock and a pipe, and Torch (voiced by Matthew Yang King) – A cutting torch-wielding member of the Dreadnoks.

Tomax and Xamot
Tomax and Xamot (voiced by Stephen Stanton) – Tomax and Xamot are identical twin brothers who are psychics with mind controlling abilities. They began as crooked cult leaders who harnessed their powers to "fleece" believers. The Twins plan to enhance their natural abilities and unleash their wrath upon the world. The key to their success lies in their connection to one another, a telepathic force so strong that if one twin is struck, the other feels every bit of pain.

When the Joes end up in their desert oasis after finding Sister Leia of their cult, the Joes end up under their control except for Tunnel Rat. Snake Eyes pretended to be mind-controlled for him and Tunnel Rat to infiltrate the temple to break their mind-control. Snake Eyes destroyed the eye that boosted Tomax and Xamot's powers causing Tunnel Rat and Snake Eyes to split up the twins.

Tomax and Xamot managed to convince Doctor Mindbender to take them with him. Later at Doctor Mindbender's laboratory, Tomax and Xamot are strapped to a table so that Doctor Mindbender can siphon their mind control for his Bio Vipers project. Doctor Mindbender later successfully siphoned their abilities for the Shadow-Viper project. At the Cisarovna Chateau, Tomax and Xamot were able to free each other and they think of planning to use telecommunications to broadcast their mind control abilities.

Firefly
Firefly (voiced by Peter MacNicol) – Call him a professional arsonist or a pyromaniac, Firefly (complete with burn marks) is portrayed as a "madman with matches" as he treats fire as if it was a living breathing human being. Firefly is sent by Baroness and Doctor Mindbender to burn the dry town of Green Ridge when they were issued a court order to prevent the construction of a dam built by Cobra Industries. First, Firefly tries to burn down Mayor Lockridge's house, but it was thwarted by Duke, Roadblock and Tunnel Rat.

Then Firefly is ordered by Baroness to torch the entire town when all Cobra personnel leave so they can blame G.I. Joe for the blaze. Duke continued to pursue Firefly, but he managed to escape and blow up the bridge out of town, forcing the Joes to TNT the dam so water can douse the flames in the town below. Duke and Snake Eyes confronted Firefly, but he escaped once again stowing away on his helicopter that Roadblock was piloting and ended up fighting Barbecue in the back causing the helicopter to lose control.

However, Roadblock got Barbecue out on time as Firefly's helicopter crashed into a cliff. It is unknown if Firefly survived the helicopter crash or not.

Doctor Venom
Doctor Venom (voiced by Michael Emerson) – Dr. Archibald Monev is a scientist for Cobra Industries who worked with Dr. Kurt Schnurr on the Anaconda Strain virus. He secretly infected Dr. Schnurr so that he'd be out of the way when Cobra releases the Anaconda Strain onto the populace and distribute the antidotes. Dr. Venom managed to get away following the intervention of the Joes.

Bio Vipers
Bio Vipers are liquid monsters created by Doctor Mindbender from experimented plants. They also have a neuro-processing compound in them. After Doctor Mindbender's lab was blown up, one Bio Viper managed to survive and make its way to a farm town. The Bio Vipers show weaknesses to explosions and weed killer. Later, Doctor Mindbender upgrades the Bio Vipers with a Bio-Dampening Chip which made them more intelligent but vulnerable to headshots, this feature has been removed in light of this weakness. A deployment system has been developed that will deliver the Bio-Vipers internationally via missiles, and to ensure they can't be traced to Cobra they're designed to disintegrate on cue.

Mecha-Vipers
Mecha-Vipers – The Mecha-Vipers are a Fusion of Bio-Vipers and the exo suit armors developed by M.A.R.S. industries. The Mecha Vipers possess neither the weaknesses of the original Bio Vipers nor the M.A.R.S exo suits.

Shadow Vipers
Shadow Vipers – The Shadow Vipers are a black-colored version of the Bio Vipers. Using the siphoning of Tomax and Xamot's paranormal abilities, Doctor Mindbender creates the Shadow Vipers to obey Storm Shadow's command through thoughts in his mind making what he calls "Synthetic Doppelgänger". The Shadow Vipers can materialize any part of themselves into ninja weapons such as katana blades and shuriken.

Techno-Viper
Techno-Viper – The Techno-Viper is an energy-draining Bio Viper that can manipulate any technology that it acquires. Due to the prototype Techno-Viper being uncontrollable, Cobra Industries had to put it into a container and keep it in cold temperatures. G.I. Joe had found a container consisting of a prototype Techno-Viper in the arctic circle. In "Castle Destro," Scarlett mentioned during the group's interrogation that the Techno-Viper had accidentally provided the coordinates to the castle and Destro states to Baroness that the only reason why the Techno-Viper would do this is an attempt by Doctor Mindbender on his life.

Human/Bio-Viper Hybrid
Human/Bio-Viper Hybrid – Upon finding an unconscious Ripcord, Doctor Mindbender and Cobra Commander had experimented on him and placed a control chip on him to make a hybrid of human and Bio-Viper. Cobra Commander states that this Bio-Viper project will be a step towards immortality.

Sewer Viper
Sewer Viper – When Doctor Mindbender was trying to duplicate the DNA combination he did to Ripcord, he created an artificial human/Bio-Viper hybrid which at first was unstable, but managed to pull itself together in the sewers. It ended up abducting a kid named Reggie and took him into the sewers after beating up a tough kid named Ray. Cobra Commander sent Doctor Mindbender to reclaim the Sewer Viper before it can be caught by the authorities. At the same time, Duke, Roadblock, Tunnel Rat and Ripcord descend into the sewers to find Reggie and the Sewer Viper.

When Reggie appeared during the conflict, Roadblock took Reggie to the surface while the others fought the Sewer Viper. Reggie claimed the Sewer Viper protected him when no one else did. Ripcord even stated that the Sewer Viper has a conscience. When Doctor Mindbender captured the Joes and Tunnel Rat's brother Teddy in the subway, the Sewer Viper arrived and attacked Doctor Mindbender and the Bio-Vipers with him. Doctor Mindbender's neuro-link helmet couldn't control the Sewer Viper; due to a lack of a control chip.

The Sewer Viper managed to remove the control chip from Ripcord. The Sewer Viper sacrifices itself to absorb the explosion from the fail-safe that Doctor Mindbender installed in the Bio-Vipers' control chips.

Cobra Troopers
Cobra Troopers (Various Voices) – The Cobra Troopers are the secret army of the Cobra organization. They have no names, and their faces are hidden behind masks. Armed with plasma pulse weapons and security batons, they guard Cobra buildings, and accompany the Baroness on missions for Cobra Industries.

B.A.T.s
B.A.T.s – The B.A.T.s are prototype robotic soldiers. Some of them were housed in medieval suits of armor. They first appeared as Destro's personal guard at his castle.

Other characters

General Abernathy
General Abernathy (voiced by Lee Majors) – Don't think he's weak because he walks with a cane, General Clayton Abernathy is tough as nails. He doesn't totally trust Cobra Industries and feels something is wrong. When he got a call from Scarlett about what she learned, General Abernathy tells her that her team made the front news about what happened at Cobra Pharmaceuticals. When Duke claims they were set up, General Abernathy tells them to turn themselves in because unless they have proof of their innocence, he can't help them. When General Abernathy asks Baroness if she needs help quarantining the nearby town, Baroness says that the military has done enough. General Abernathy then appointed Flint to lead a team of military officers to bring Duke in.

Jinx
Jinx (voiced by Kim Mai Guest) – Kimi Arashikage is a kunoichi who is the daughter of Hard Master and cousin of Tomisaburo Arashikage. After the death of her father, Kimi and Snake Eyes left the clan and relocated to a cabin in the mountains. As Snake Eyes' first apprentice in ninjistu, she calls herself "Jinx" because she seems to bring only bad luck to those around her.

When Storm Shadow tracks Snake Eyes to his hidden dojo, he managed to make off with Jinx and convinces her to join him after making the claim that Snake Eyes killed her father. While Storm Shadow goes after G.I. Joe, going back by her real name, Kimi goes back to Japan to lead the Arashikage in his place. Before heading back, she found the same type of throat poker that was found by her father's body. Later, she returns wearing a hi-tech suit created by Destro and assigned to assassinate Cobra Commander.

During that mission, she ran into Scarlett and Snake Eyes and still blames Snake Eyes for Hard Master's death until Scarlett told her that the throat poker was a medical tool design to allow someone to breathe through a hole in their throat. Eventually, Jinx learns the full story behind her father's death as a guilt-ridden Storm Shadow gives her full control of the clan. Jinx eventually returns to Japan to lead the Arashikage in the ideal path that her father and Snake Eyes intended.

Stalker
Stalker (voiced by Andrew Kishino) – Stalker appeared in a flashback in "Homecoming" Pt. 2 where he was among the soldiers trying to stop a weapons trade held by M.A.R.S. Industries. During a flashback sequence, he is referred to as "Stalker One". He is seen leading a squad of soldiers to intercept gun runners in a jungle. Duke (who was a member of Stalker's team) disobeys his orders after Lady Jaye's helicopter is shot down and plans to rescue her.

Tripwire
Tripwire (voiced by Andrew Kishino) – Tripwire appeared in a flashback as Private Skoog in "Homecoming" Pt. 2 where he accidentally stepped on a pressure-activated landmine and was saved by Duke who pushes him off the landmine taking the brunt of the explosion on his back.

Steeler
Steeler (voiced by Eddie Mata) – Steeler appeared one of the war veterans that fell victim to the experiments conducted by Destro and Scrap-Iron in the episode "Rage". While trapped in the exo-armor, he introduces himself as Ralph Pulaski to Tunnel Rat. After Destro and Scrap-Iron are defeated and he recovered in the hospital, Steeler thanks the G.I. Joes for their good deeds and vows to help them when they need his services.

Doc
Doc (voiced by Phil LaMarr) – Dr. Greer is a physician who first appeared in the episode "Rage" trying to treat the victims of Destro and Scrap-Iron's experiments. Initially suspicious of the Joes due to Tunnel Rat (one of the victims) being checked in under "unknown," Dr. Greer helped the Joes escape from Flint after they helped cure the victims.

Law
Law (voiced by Corey Burton) – Christopher Lavigne is a prison guard who works at a prison with his dog Order. He is displeased with the warden's illegal fight activities. When Flint and Lady Jaye storm the prison, Order takes down Granger (the Captain of the Guards) and Law saves Flint from two inmates.

Barbecue
Barbecue (voiced by Jerry O'Connell) – Gabriel Kelly is a firefighter who worked for Green Ridge Fire Department at the time when Cobra Industries was constructing a dam. He was against the Anti-Cobra protests at first, but ended up assisting Roadblock in blowing up their dam to put out a fire in town that Firefly started after realizing Cobra had no intention of sharing the irrigation with his home suburb. When asked by Roadblock how he got his burns on his left arm, Kelly states that "a few years ago, some mad man with a book of matches took everything from him." Roadblock gave him the nickname "Barbecue" which he liked because it suited him well. When Firefly ambushed Barbecue and Roadblock in the helicopter, Barbecue fought Firefly until Roadblock got him out of the helicopter. When offered to help out G.I. Joe, Barbecue stays in Green Ridge to help rebuild it.

Snow Job
Snow Job (voiced by Nolan North) – Harlan Moore is an old army buddy of Tunnel Rat from his arctic trooper unit who lives in Canada. He allows the Joes to stay with him in his cabin for the night. Snow Job is still mourning for the day when an avalanche buries his best friend and fellow arctic trooper Frostbite during an unsanctioned ski and snowboard trip. Snow Job ends up assisting the Joes in their fight against Storm Shadow and the Shadow Vipers. He blows up his own house to let the Joes escape. Snow Job survives the blast, evades another avalanche on his skis, and escapes with the Joes. In the end, Snow Job leaves on a snow mobile that Duke gives him to another location taking Timber with him to watch on Snake Eyes' behalf.

Frostbite
Frostbite (voiced by Andrew Kishino) – Farley Seward is an arctic trooper. He was seen in a flashback as a teammate Snow Job and Tunnel Rat. During an unsanctioned skiing trip with Snow Job, both of them got caught in an avalanche. Snow Job emerged from the snow, but Frostbite didn't.

Timber
Timber – Timber is a timber wolf whose foot was stuck in a bear trap in Canada. After Snake Eyes rescued him from the bear trap, Timber and Snake Eyes were assaulted by Storm Shadow and the Shadow Vipers; Timber continued to fight with Snake Eyes until the end. At the end, Snakes Eyes asked Snow Job to watch his new pet Timber.

Shipwreck
Shipwreck (voiced by Carlos Alazraqui) – Hector Delgado is a ship captain and former Cobra Industries worker who now charters people across the ocean for money on his vessel called Courtney. Shipwreck got his nickname when he had his ship sunk by Cobra Industries after he wouldn't dump some chemicals at sea on their behalf. So they sank his ship and blamed him for it. G.I. Joe ends up having to trade the Coyote to carry them on their ship to Washington D.C. During the cruise, the Joes container gets loose unleashing an energy-draining Techno-Viper that drains the electricity from the ship.

Shipwreck ends up helping the Joes when it comes to stopping the Techno-Viper before it reaches a heavily populated area. Despite Shipwreck not wanting to lose another ship, the Joes had no choice but to sink his ship. They had to use fire extinguishers to take down the Techno-Viper instead of their plasma guns because it was feeding off its electricity and it hated the cold blasts from the extinguishers.

Shipwreck still wouldn't lose "Courtney" causing Roadblock to drive the Coyote that the Techno-Viper leeched itself onto into the water. Luckily, "Courtney" managed to catch the Coyote in its net and Shipwreck gives Roadblock his beloved truck back. After a brief communication with the USS Flagg, Shipwreck joins up with G.I. Joe when the Techno-Viper's signal is traced to Scotland as he still has a score to settle with Cobra Industries. He has become the Joes method of travel overseas when they ventured to Hawaii, Scotland, and Mexico.

Cover Girl
Cover Girl – Courtney Kreiger is a model that Shipwreck admired most so he named his ship after her. When Tunnel Rat sarcastically asked him about why he named his "tub" (ship) Courtney, Shipwreck pointed to his poster of model Courtney Kreiger (aka Cover Girl) and said "The word is "ship", Soldier, and as long as you're on mine, you will respect Courtney Kreiger". A confused Duke asked "The model?" and Shipwreck replied, "My Courtney might not be as pretty, but she's reliable."

Red Star
Red Star (voiced by Liam O'Brien) – Col. Anatoly Krimov is a member of the Oktober Guard who has an axe to grind with Baroness' family due to what the Cisarovna Family did to his people during their reign generations ago. He has a scar running from his right cheek to his mouth and a red star on his right hand.

In the episode "Union of the Snake", Red Star infiltrated the summit at the Cisarovna Chateau disguised as a chef only for the Joes to interfere with an explosion knocking them out enough to be captured.

When Snake Eyes and Tunnel Rat rescued the Joes, they take Red Star with them. Red Star wanted to blow up the Cisarovna Family despite the objections of the Joes. Red Star ends up helping the Joes stop their mind-control plot before Red Star results to blow up the Cisarovna Chateau in 9 minutes.

Snake Eyes manages to prevent Red Star from blowing up the Cisarovna Chateau while Duke and Scarlett destroy the satellite dish. Red Star then opens a tunnel for the Joes to escape in while he reports to his superiors that the mission was aborted.

Airtight
Airtight (voiced by Troy Baker) – Dr. Kurt Schnurr is a biochemist who was working with Dr. Monev on the Anaconda Strain for Cobra Industries and hoped that Cobra Industries will allow an antidote to be made. When he ended up infected due to a leak in Kurt's hazmat suit, he had to be quarantined. When the Joes in hazmat suits infiltrated the facility (after being hired by Kurt's daughter Elena) and found him in the quarantine area, they found him with the Anaconda Strain's symptoms. Kurt then shows that the rat carrier is still alive. When the Joes end up learning of the cure in BioVault C, they end up having to break down the glass to get Kurt to the Anaconda Strain Antidote causing the company to go under lockdown.

It is then discovered that his partner Dr. Monev orchestrated Kurt's infection as part of Cobra Industries plot to release the Anaconda Strain onto the populace and distribute the antidotes. When the Anaconda Strain virus starts to take its toll, Snake Eyes sprays the antidote on Kurt, Duke, and the rat carrier. Kurt and Elena end up relocated to L.A. to head to Kurt's cousin. However, Kurt and the rat were infected too long to end up as carriers.

Scarlett and Snake Eyes catch up to him on the airport as Kurt exits from the plane to prevent himself from infecting the people. Snake Eyes dove after him and caught him while Scarlett leaked the antidote into the plane's oxygen tanks curing anyone that got infected. Kurt vows to perfect a permanent antidote for the Anaconda Strain virus as Elena vows to help him. Kurt is also seen wearing a new containment suit due to him and the rat still being carriers.

Vehicles

Coyote
Coyote – The Coyote is the name of a Cobra X-2 vehicle that G.I. Joe stole in the first two episodes during their escape from the Cobra Pharmaceutical explosion, and named in honor of Breaker's old codename. The Coyote was affectionately named by Roadblock (as Breaker was forced to abandon the nickname when Cobra tied it to him) who treats the truck like a "best friend" as Tunnel Rat pointed out. According to Breaker, it contains multiple defense options, including a manned plasma turret, rear-end shielding, camouflage technology and a supercharger that can make the vehicle accelerate to high speeds. In "Shipwrecked", when a Techno-Viper hijacked the Coyote, it revealed other types of weaponry that Breaker didn't know about.

USS Flagg
USS Flagg – The USS Flagg is an aircraft carrier that was in sight when Duke pointed to it and told Joes and Shipwreck to not let Techno-Viper to touch that ship. After Joes and Shipwreck defeated Techno-Viper and rescued Roadblock and the Coyote from the ocean, Shipwreck got a radio call from the ship which was introduced as the USS Flagg and asked him if he "needed any assistance". Shipwreck replied "Courtney's just fine, thanks for asking".

Cobra Flight Pod
Cobra Flight Pod (aka: "Trouble Bubble") – The Cobra Flight Pod is a one-person flying machine designed by Cobra Industries which has a front pulse laser cannon and two Gatling guns mounted on both sides. The flight pods originated from the old animated series and were introduced in Renegades episode "Union of the Snake" when The Baroness orders the Cobra vipers to launch the "flight pods" to run an aerial sweep of the Joes and Red Star's escape from her chateau. When they are being chased by the pods, Scarlet asks "What was that?" and Red Star responds "That...is trouble. Cobra Flight Pods. Trouble Bubbles." Because they usually fly in groups, causing their enemies to be in big trouble if they are surrounded.

Cobra Drone
Cobra Drone – An airborne contraption that is mostly used as a scout for reconnaissance before an attack. Its trademark is its red eye that's actually a high-tech camera for video surveillance and a live broadcast. Or as Roadblock explains it, the Cobra Drone is "a flying camera with guns." In episode "Prodigal", this "eye in the sky" was controlled by a computer chip embedded in Ripcord's head when he was taken by Cobra and used in the "Patient X" experiment turning him into a human Bio-Viper hybrid.

Battle Mech
Battle Mech – Cobra Commander's personal die-cast battle mech suit. It features dual plasma pulse rapid-fire pistols and huge fists that fire four missiles each and also shoots electro pulses that can stun or tease enemies once in its grasp. First featured in episode 20 and later in episode 26.

H.I.S.S. Tank
H.I.S.S. Tank (stands for High Speed Sentry) – Destro designed this prototype tank for Cobra Industries. Its armor is invulnerable to enemy plasma pulse fire and features dual plasma pulse cannons mounted on top. First featured in episode 26.

References

External links

Lists of characters in American television animation
Lists of G.I. Joe characters